The K-NFB Reader (an acronym for Kurzweil — National Federation of the Blind Reader) is a handheld electronic reading device for the blind. It was developed in a partnership between Ray Kurzweil and National Federation of the Blind.

The original version of the reader was composed of a digital camera and a PDA, which contained specialised OCR software and speech synthesizers to read the scanned material aloud.  It was released at a price of $3,495.

The software was later ported to the Symbian operating system, to be used on Nokia N82 camera phones, with a new price of $1,595.

Developed by the National Federation of the Blind and Sensotec NV in 2014, an iOS port was released at a price of $99. An Android version was released shortly after.

KNFB Reader can read: 

 Receipts
 Package labels and mail
 Product and nutritional information
 Print on your computer or tablet screen
 Longer documents such as books and user manuals
 Private documents such as tax materials, mortgage documents, bills, and medical reports
 Ebooks and documents in the ePub format
 Documents in more than thirty languages

Innovative Features 

 Text Detection (shows you where there is print to capture)
 Tilt and Viewfinder Assist (ensures you capture the entire page)
 Text Highlighting (pinpoints text for dyslexic and other print-disabled users)

See also

 Kurzweil Educational Systems

References

External links
 Official site

Blindness equipment